Nathaniel "Nathan" Ford Moore (January 31, 1884 – January 9, 1910) was an American golfer who competed in the 1904 Summer Olympics. He was the son of James Hobart Moore, a wealthy businessman with controlling interest in National Biscuit Company, Continental Can, Diamond Match and the Chicago, Rock Island & Pacific Railroad; and his wife Lora Moore. He died of natural causes in the Chez Shaw brothel in Chicago's Levee district after spending much of the previous night at the Everleigh Club.

He was born in Illinois.

In 1904 he was part of the American team which won the gold medal. He finished 28th in this competition. In the individual competition he finished 19th in the qualification and was eliminated in the second round of the match play.

Citations

References
Abbott, Karen (2007) Sin in the Second City: Madams, Ministers, Playboys, and the Battle for America's Soul. New York: Random House

External links
 Nathaniel Moore's profile at databaseOlympics
 Nathaniel Moore's profile at Sports Reference.com
  findagrave.com

American male golfers
Amateur golfers
Golfers at the 1904 Summer Olympics
Olympic gold medalists for the United States in golf
Medalists at the 1904 Summer Olympics
Golfers from Illinois
1884 births
1910 deaths